Vladimir Pavlovich Pasyukov (Pasjukov) (Russian:Владимир Павлович Пасюков ) (July 29, 1944 – June 20, 2011) was a Russian opera, folk and choir singer who possessed a powerful, low-ranging basso profondo (oktavist) voice. He was born in Saint Petersburg.

Pasyukov had a melodious tone for the depth of the notes he sang. His quality of singing was consistent over his range. Notably he had a dark distinct velvety timbre. His voice gave profound power to the higher overtones sung by the rest of the choir. Pasyukov retired a few years before his death on June 20, 2011. He was lauded by many as among the finest oktavist singers in history.

Career
In the 1980s, Pasyukov worked in the Leningrad Academic Glinka Capella, then sang mainly with the Saint Petersburg Chamber Choir followed by The Male Choir of St. Petersburg. He also sang in the choir of the Kazan Cathedral, Saint Petersburg. Pasyukov also collaborated with other choirs, such as the Male Choir of Valaam.

See also
 Basso Profondo
 Russian Orthodox chant

Further reading 
 Morosan, Vladimir Choral Performance in Pre-revolutionary Russia, UMI Research Press, 1986.  
 Rommereim, J. C., "The Choir and How to Direct It: Pavel Chesnokov's magnum opus", Choral Journal, Official Publication of the American Choral Directors Association, XXXVIII, no. 7, 1998

Russian basses
Russian opera singers
Operatic basses